The Grass Mud Horse is a Chinese Internet meme and kuso parody based on a word play of the ubiquitous Mandarin profanity cào nǐ mā, which literally means "fuck your mother".

Homophonic puns are commonly used in Chinese language as silly humors to delight people, and have become an important component of jokes and standup comedy in Chinese culture. Grass Mud Horse is one of the made-up "Baidu 10 Mythical Creatures" created in a hoax article on Baidu Baike in early 2009, whose names all come from obscene puns. It has become an Internet chat forum cult phenomenon in China and has garnered worldwide press attention, with videos, cartoons and merchandise of the animal (which is said to resemble the alpaca) having appeared.

Etymology and species

The Caonima, literally "Grass Mud Horse", is supposedly a species of alpaca. The name is similar to a profanity, which translates as "fuck your mother". The comparison with the "animal" name is not an actual homophone: the two terms have the same consonants and vowels with different tones, and are represented by different characters.

According to the original, anonymous article from Baidu Baike, Grass Mud Horses originate from an area known as the "Mahler Gobi" Desert (Mǎlè Gēbì, which resembles the Chinese characters , māle ge bī, meaning "your mother's fucking cunt"). Some variants of the animal are known as "Fertile Grass Mud Horses" (Wò Cǎonímǎ, which resembles , Wǒ cào nǐ mā, meaning "I fuck your mother").

The Grass Mud Horse can only eat fertile grass (wò cǎo, which resembles , Wǒ cào, meaning "I fuck!" or simply "Fuck!"). Other subspecies are known as "Crazy/Violent/Insane Grass Mud Horses" (Kuáng Cǎonímǎ), which are considered the "kings" of the Caonima. The initial image found in the original Baidu Baike article was a zebra, but was replaced with an alpaca in subsequent revisions.

Habitat

The animal is characterised as "lively, intelligent and tenacious". However, their existence is said to be threatened by "river crabs" which are invading their habitat.

The river crab (héxiè) symbolises internet censorship in China. Its pronunciation resembles the word for "harmony" (héxié), in reference to the "harmonious society", to which the Chinese leadership professes to aspire, and which Chinese internet censors use to justify internet censorship. As a result, when a post on a microblog is deleted, the censorship notice says that the post has been "harmonized" (héxié), which is pronounced similar to "river crab" (héxiè) in Mandarin Chinese, so the netizens say that the post has been eaten by the "river crab". 

The term "crab" itself is rural slang, meaning "a bully who uses power through force", and the "river crab" has become a symbol of crude censorship backed with the threat of force.

Formats
Music videos, "documentaries", and cartoons about the Grass Mud Horse started appearing on the internet in 2009. The original Grass Mud Horse music video's musical arrangement of a children's choir has been compared to It's a Small World, and it scored 1.4 million hits in its first three months. A cartoon about the Grass Mud Horse attracted a quarter million views, and a nature documentary on its habits received 180,000 more hits in the same amount of time. Even though some Grass Mud Horse videos were not technically blocked by Chinese censors, some had their sound blocked, with a message saying "This video contains an audio track that has not been authorized by WMG."

Yazhou Zhoukan reported that Zhan Bin, a teacher at the Beijing Institute of Fashion Technology, created a new Chinese character by fusing the three Chinese character radicals for "grass", "mud", and "horse". The word has no official pronunciation. "Gunnima" and "Gannima" are puns for "fuck off" and "fuck your mother" respectively.

The "Grass Mud Horse" became widely known on the English-language web following the publication of a New York Times article on the phenomenon on 11 March 2009, which sparked widespread discussion on blogs. In March 2011, "Grass Mud Horse" themed merchandise, such as plush dolls, began being sold over the Internet. One Guangzhou toy manufacturer reportedly produced its first batch of 150 Grass Mud Horse cuddly toys with official birth certificates issued by Mahler Gebi Mystical Creatures Bureau. The animals come in brown and white, named "Ma Le" and "Ge Bi" respectively, and sell for 40 yuan each. To accompany these, a user's and feeding manual have been created. Whereas they were called 'Caonima' before the crackdown, Internet sellers now list them using the correct Chinese term, '' (Alpaca).

In 2009, renowned artist Ai Weiwei published an image of himself nude with only a 'Caonima' hiding his genitals, with a caption "草泥马挡中央" ("cǎonímǎ dǎng zhōngyāng", literally "a Grass Mud Horse covering the center". One interpretation of the caption is: "fuck your mother, Communist Party Central Committee". Political observers speculated that the photo may have contributed to Ai's arrest in 2011 by angering Chinese Communist Party hardliners.

According to a study by NordPass, caonima was the 43rd most common password in China in 2021.

Grass Mud Horse Day 

In 2012, Chinese netizens started to designate the date 1 July as the "Grass Mud Horse Day". The date coincides with the "Party Day" in China which is to celebrate the founding of the Chinese Communist Party.

Political discourse 
The China Digital Times sees Caonima as the "de facto mascot of netizens in China fighting for free expression, inspiring poetry, photos and videos, artwork, lines of clothing, and more." It is an illustration of the "resistance discourse" of Chinese internet users with "increasingly dynamic and sometimes surprising presence of an alternative political discourse: images, frames, metaphors and narratives that have been generated from Internet memes [that] undermine the values and ideology that reproduce compliance with the Chinese Communist Party's authoritarian regime, and, as such, force an opening for free expression and civil society in China."

Caonima is an expression of a broader Chinese internet culture of spoofing, mockery, punning, and parody known as e'gao, which includes video mash-ups and other types of bricolage.

Censorship
The Beijing Television Cultural Center fire led to Chinese internet users creating a number of digitally manipulated image parodies, including one with a Caonima's outline in the smoke.

On 20 March 2009, the New York Times reported that a Chinese contributor to Global Voices Online posted a message from an Internet administrator to managers of online bulletin boards warning that "any content related with Grass-Mud Horse should not be promoted and hyped" because "the issue has been elevated to a political level ... The overseas media has exaggerated the incident as a confrontation between netizens and the government."

In a press conference on 25 March, the Foreign Ministry confirmed that China's access to YouTube had been officially blocked since two days earlier. According to Reporters Without Borders, the block was an attempt to stem videos showing Chinese repression of the Tibetan population in the run-up to the 50th anniversary of the Tibetan uprising of 10 March 1959, and to block access to the popular Grass Mud Horse video posted in early March.

The State Administration of Radio, Film, and Television issued a directive on 30 March 2009 to highlight 31 categories of content prohibited online, including violence, pornography, and content which may "incite ethnic discrimination or undermine social stability". Many netizens believe the instruction follows the official embarrassment over the rise of the "Grass Mud Horse" phenomenon. Industry observers believe that the move was designed to stop the spread of parodies or other comments on politically sensitive issues in the runup to the 20th anniversary of the 4 June Tiananmen Square protests. 

Following the government's directive, most Chinese essays and blog postings made about the Grass Mud Horse have been removed from the Internet after being discovered by government censors.  Some of these citizen efforts to keep the Grass Mud Horse alive have moved offshore to the U.S. and elsewhere, including for example the creation of an independent Canadian publishing house (see Mudgrass Press) referencing the meme.

The Caonima reappeared as a subject of online cartoon satire following the announcement of the Green Dam Youth Escort pornography blocking software project.

Grass Mud Horse as a trickster 

The trickster figure is a character found across the study of myth, folklore religion as a type of archetypal character across cultures. The trickster figure is characterised by intelligence and a trait for playing with social norms and taboos, often enticing or deceiving others into breaking rules. Tricksters therefore might avoid stricture by authorities or figures in power even to the extent of making those authorities look foolish. For these reasons the anthropologist James Cuffe has called the Grass Mud Horse an example of an online trickster- mythic and duplicitous in nature. 

Rather than the Grass Mud Horse being simply subversive in the face of internet censorship, Cuffe proposes the trickster as a liminal character that carries a cultural function as a heuristic device. This allows the audience to "reevaluate their own experiential understanding against that of their communities. By framing itself against and in spite of limits the trickster offers new coordinates by which one can reassess and judge one's own experiences." 

In the case of China this can be the communication of the experience of censorship to those who have not experienced censorship but can come to understand it as something that happens within their community through shared stories.

See also

Baka
Chun Ge
Internet in the People's Republic of China
Jia Junpeng
Mother insult
Lufsig
Very erotic very violent
Yax Lizard
River crab (Internet slang)
Socialist Harmonious Society
Mat (Russian profanity)

References

Bibliography
 
 Awflasher. "What is the Grass Mud Horse?". Youtube. 1 February 2009. Retrieved 18 February 2012. [Chinese].
  [Chinese screenshot].
 
 
 
 Feifei2226. "The Grass Mud Horse Song, Animated Version, Bring Your Own Sunglasses!!!!!!". Youtube. 6 February 2009. Retrieved 18 February 2012. [Chinese].
 
  Retrieved 24 February 2012.
 
 
 
  In 
 
 
 
 
 
 
 
 Xh1120. "Animal World Special on the Mahler Gobi's Grass Mud Horse". Youtube. 28 January 2009. Retrieved 18 February 2012. [Chinese].
 Xiaohe1120xu. "Animal World Special on the Mahler Gobi's Grass Mud Horse: Complete Version". Youtube. 7 February 2009. Retrieved 18 February 2012.

External links

"CDT Launches the Grass-Mud Horse Lexicon", China Digital Times, 7 December 2010
China Digital Times' Grass-mud Horse Lexicon, as retrieved by the Wayback Machine on 4 March 2016
The official Mud Grass Horse Song in the original Chinese with English annotations.
Sim Chi Yin, "Mythical creature a not-so-secret weapon against Net nannies", Straits Times, 27 March 2009

Internet memes introduced in 2009
Political Internet memes
Chinese Internet slang
Fictional horses
Homonymy in Chinese
Language games
Profanity
Politics of China
2009 in China
Stuffed toys
Horses in China